Konstantin Anatolyevich Ushakov (born 24 March 1970) is a Russian retired volleyball player, who was a member of the Men's National Team that won the silver medal at the 2000 Summer Olympics in Sydney, Australia. Playing as a setter he won the 2002 Volleyball World League with Russia, and the 1999 World Cup. A four-time Olympian he also competed at the 2004 Summer Olympics, claiming the bronze medal.

Working as the head coach he guided the Russian club Dinamo Krasnodar to the silver medal in the 2015 FIVB Club World Championship.

References

External links
FIVB Profile

1970 births
Living people
Russian men's volleyball players
Soviet men's volleyball players
Volleyball players at the 1992 Summer Olympics
Volleyball players at the 1996 Summer Olympics
Volleyball players at the 2000 Summer Olympics
Volleyball players at the 2004 Summer Olympics
Olympic volleyball players of the Unified Team
Olympic volleyball players of Russia
Olympic silver medalists for Russia
Olympic bronze medalists for Russia
Olympic medalists in volleyball
Sportspeople from Omsk
Ural Ufa volleyball players
Medalists at the 2004 Summer Olympics
Medalists at the 2000 Summer Olympics